Beauport—Limoilou is a federal electoral district in Quebec City, Quebec, Canada, that has been represented in the House of Commons of Canada since 2004.

The riding was created in 2003 as "Beauport" from parts of Beauport—Montmorency—Côte-de-Beaupré—Île-d'Orléans, Quebec and Quebec East ridings. It was renamed "Beauport—Limoilou" after the 2004 election.

Geography

The riding, in the Quebec region of Capitale-Nationale, consists of the eastern part of Quebec City, namely the boroughs of Limoilou and most of Beauport.

The neighbouring ridings are Québec, Charlesbourg—Haute-Saint-Charles, Portneuf—Jacques-Cartier, Montmorency—Charlevoix—Haute-Côte-Nord, and Lévis—Bellechasse.

This riding lost territory to Beauport—Côte-de-Beaupré—Île d'Orléans—Charlevoix and gained territory from Montmorency—Charlevoix—Haute-Côte-Nord during the 2012 electoral redistribution.

Former boundaries

Demographics
According to the Canada 2016 Census

Population: 96 029 (92 944 in 2011)
Sex: Male 48%; Female 52%
Language
Mother tongue: French 93.3%, Spanish 1.3%, English 1.1%, Arabic 0.8%
Home Language: French 96.2%, Spanish 0.8% , English 0.7%, Arabic 0.4%
Knowledge: French 99.4%, English 34.8%, Spanish 4.7%, Arabic 1.3%
Ethnicity: Canadien 68.0%, French 27.8%, Irish 5.0%, Aboriginal 4.1%, Quebecois 2.9%, African 2.4%, Scottish 1.9% , Latin American 1.8%
Visible Minority: 7.2% (Black 3.1%, Latin American 1.5%, 0.9% Arab) 
Religions:  Catholic 86.5%, None 12.7%, Protestant and other Christian 3.3%,  Muslim 1.3%,  Other 0.8%
Households/Occupied dwellings: 48 440
Occupied dwellings: Apartment < 5 stories: 60%, Single-detached house 21%; Duplex 10%
Households: Single 45.0%, Couples - no children 24%, Couples - with Children 18%, Single parent 9.6% 

Median income: $31,568 (2015) 
Average income: $37,090 (2015)

Members of Parliament

This riding has elected the following Members of Parliament:

Election results

Beauport—Limoilou

Beauport

See also
 List of Canadian federal electoral districts
 Past Canadian electoral districts

References

Campaign expense data from Elections Canada
2011 Results from Elections Canada
Riding history for Beauport from the Library of Parliament
Riding history for Beauport—Limoilou from the Library of Parliament

Notes

External links
 Politwitter
 Project Democracy
 Pundit's Guide
 StatsCan District Profile

Quebec federal electoral districts
Federal electoral districts of Quebec City